Matthias Reim (born 26 November 1957) is a German pop and Schlager singer. His 1990 single "Verdammt, ich lieb' dich" ("Damn, I love you") was a hit in several European countries and spent 16 consecutive weeks at the number 1 spot in the German charts. He unexpectedly returned 23 years later to the top on the charts with "Unendlich" in 2013.

Early life 
Reim was born on 26 November 1957 in Korbach and grew up in Homberg. His father was the director of the gymnasium in Homberg. After receiving his Abitur, he began his undergraduate studies in the German and English languages as well as Germanistic and Anglistic literatures in Göttingen. This took 18 terms – this is above average, as he spent its time predominantly in the music studio and not in the lecture-room.

Career

1980–89: Fallen Dice and Fair Fax
Reim's career began as a songwriter, writing for Bernhard Brink, Roberto Blanco and Tina York. He played in a rock band called Fallen Dice with Pete Goldenberg and Norbert Preis. Their debut album, Pasch 1, was released in 1981. He spent a brief time as lead singer of the band Aqua before their dissolusion in 1984. In 1986, Reim formed the synthpop duo Fair Fax with Jörg Wiesner. They released one single, "Satellite Dream", through Hansa Records.

1990–99: Solo career
Reim's debut single "Verdammt, ich lieb' dich" ("Damn, I love you") topped the German Singles Chart for sixteen consecutive weeks in 1990. It also reached no. 1 in Austria, Belgium, the Netherlands and Switzerland. His debut album, Reim, was released through Polydor on 15 June 1990. He released a further nine albums through Polydor, including 1994's Zauberland which was re-recorded in English the following year.

2000–2015: The Electrola Years
Reim began to see increased commercial success again in the 2000s after signing with Electrola.

In September 2004, Reim released the single "Vergiß Es (Forget It)" with Bonnie Tyler. It featured on Reim's compilation album, Déjà Vu, and reached no. 64 on the German Singles Chart. They recorded a second duet on Reim's thirteenth album, Sieben Leben (2010).

In 2011, Reim released a Christmas album titled Die große Weihnachtsparty, which includes a German cover of "Last Christmas" by Wham!.

In 2013, Reim topped the German Albums Chart for a second time with Unendlich.

2016–present: Recent work
Reim moved to RCA Records in 2016 for the release of his sixteenth album, Phoenix, which peaked at no. 2 in Germany. His subsequent albums Meteor (2018), MR20 (2019) and Matthias (2022) all peaked within the Top 3.

Discography

Albums

References

External links 
 [ Biography of Reim] on AllMusic
 Biography of Reim on IMDb

1957 births
Living people
People from Korbach
German male singers
German singer-songwriters
Schlager musicians
University of Göttingen alumni